Samooidea is a large superfamily in the Grassatores group of harvestmen. It includes around 380 species distributed throughout the tropics. They are characterized by the complex male genitalia, with eversible complementary sclerites.

The Samooidea are closely related to Zalmoxoidea, although the exact relationships are not yet understood.

Families included 
 Biantidae Thorell, 1889
 Escadabiidae Kury & Pérez, 2003
 Kimulidae Pérez, Kury & Alonso-Zarazaga, 2007
 Podoctidae Roewer, 1912
 Samoidae Sørensen, 1886
 Stygnommatidae Roewer, 1923

References

Harvestmen
Arachnid superfamilies